Çavdır District is a district of the Burdur Province of Turkey. Its seat is the town of Çavdır. Its area is 482 km2, and its population is 12,599 (2021).

Composition
There are two municipalities in Çavdır District:
 Çavdır
 Söğüt

There are 10 villages in Çavdır District:

 Ambarcık 
 Bölmepınar 
 Büyükalan 
 İshakköy 
 Karaköy 
 Kayacık 
 Kızıllar
 Kozağacı
 Küçükalan 
 Yazır

References

Districts of Burdur Province